The Cason Shale is a Late Ordovician to Middle Silurian geologic formation in the Ozark Plateaus of Arkansas. The name was introduced in 1894 by Henry Shaler Williams in his study of Arkansas. Williams designated a type locality at what was known as the Cason tract and mine, near Batesville, Independence County, Arkansas, however, he did not assign a stratotype. As of 2017, a reference section has not been designated for this unit.

Paleofauna

Conodonts

 Acodus
 A. inornatus
 A. unicostatus
 Ambalodus
 A. triangularis
 Amorphognatus
 Belodella
 B. flexa
 Belodina
 B. inclinata
 B. ornata
 Carniodus
 Cordylodus
 C. delicatus
 C. flexuosus
 Distacodus
 D. mehli
 D. posterocostatus
 D. procerus

 Distomodus
 D. kentuckyensis
 Drepanodus
 D. homocurvatus
 D. simplex
 Eoligonodina
 E. delicata
 Hadrognathus
 H. staurognathoides
 Hindeodella
 H. equidentata
 Keislognathus
 K. gracilis
 Ligonodina
 L. egregia
 L. silurica
 Neoprioniodus
 N. bicurvatoides
 N. planus

 Oistodus
 O. venustus
 Ozarkodina
 O. gaertneri
 O. tenuis
 Paltodus
 P. multicostatus
 P. trigonius
 Panderodus
 P. gracilis
 P. miseri
 P. simplex
 P. sulcatus
 P. unicostatus
 Phragmodus
 P. undatus
 Plectospathodus
 P. extensus
 Prioniodina
 P. irregularis

 Pterospathodus
 Scolopodus
 S. insculptus
 Spathognathodus
 S. manganiferus
 S. procerus
 S. sweeti
 S. wolfordi
 Tetraprioniodus
 T. superbus
 Trichonodella
 T. brassfieldensis
 T. carinata
 T. diminuta
 T. exacta
 T. variflexa
 Zygognathus
 Z. mira

See also

 List of fossiliferous stratigraphic units in Arkansas
 Paleontology in Arkansas

References

Ordovician Arkansas
Silurian Arkansas